Ancistrocarphus is a genus of flowering plants in the family Asteraceae. It contains two known species, both native to western North America. These plants are often treated as members of genus Stylocline, but they are not as closely related to Stylocline species as they are to plants of other genera, especially Hesperevax.

The better-known species in this genus is Ancistrocarphus filagineus, which is known by the common names woolly fishhooks and false neststraw. It is found in Idaho, Oregon, Nevada, California, and Baja California. It is a woolly annual herb growing in a squat patch on the ground. The other species is Ancistrocarphus keilii, a rare and poorly known California endemic not described until 2004.

References

External links
Jepson Manual Treatment: A. filagineus
United States Department of Agriculture Plants Profile

Gnaphalieae
Asteraceae genera
Flora of North America